St Patrick's College is a Catholic Girls' Secondary  Day and Boarding School located in Townsville, North Queensland, Australia.

History
St Patrick's College was founded in 1878 by a group of Irish nuns from the Sisters of Mercy order. Their foundress Catherine McAuley, began the Sisters of Mercy in 1831.  The Sisters were pioneers of education in North Queensland, and the college stands as a monument to their contributions.  With onset of World War II in the Pacific, St Patrick's vacated the College buildings located on The Strand for use by the allied war effort, namely the W.R.A.A.F units. The Wartime College and boarding students were moved to different locations, West End and Ravenswood respectively.

During the 1960s and 1970s the college adapted to educational requirements of exam criteria developed by governmental Educational Departments. Later government grants brought new infrastructure providing a library, new science laboratories, social science and language facilities and later computer technology.   Current students can participate in the numerous extra curricular activities common to most modern high schools, including national sporting competitions and UN youth summit.

Graduates
Two mid twentieth century graduates are Madge Ryan and Valma Weetman. Valma Weetman joined the R.A.A.F and became a Corporal during her first two years issuing kits in a Sydney airmen Depot. She was one of several ladies selected to appear in news articles promoting women recruitments into the defence forces. Madge Ryan moved south to pursue an acting career. After time with the Australian Broadcasting Commission, she moved to London working as a stage actress. One of her notable roles was the character Pearl in the Summer of the Seventeenth Doll.

References

External links

Girls' schools in Queensland
Catholic schools in Queensland
High schools in Queensland
Schools in Townsville
Educational institutions established in 1878
Queensland in World War II
Alliance of Girls' Schools Australasia
1878 establishments in Australia